Society's Driftwood is a 1917 American silent drama film directed by Louis Chaudet and starring Grace Cunard, Charles West and Joseph W. Girard.

Cast
 Grace Cunard as Lena Rogers
 Charles West as Tison Grant
 Joseph W. Girard as Judge Grant
 William Musgrave as Paul Rogers

References

Bibliography
 Rainey, Buck. Sweethearts of the Sage: Biographies and Filmographies of 258 actresses appearing in Western movies. McFarland & Company, 1992.

External links
 

1917 films
1917 drama films
1910s English-language films
American silent feature films
Silent American drama films
American black-and-white films
Universal Pictures films
Films directed by Louis Chaudet
1910s American films